Mechercharimyces asporophorigenens  is a bacterium from the genus of Mechercharimyces which has been isolated from sediments from Palau. Mechercharimyces asporophorigenens produces the cytotoxic substance urukthapelstatin A.

References

Further reading

External links
Type strain of Mechercharimyces asporophorigenens at BacDive -  the Bacterial Diversity Metadatabase

Bacillales
Bacteria described in 2006